The 2012 World Outdoor Bowls Championship men's fours  was held at the Lockleys Bowling Club in Adelaide, Australia. Some of the qualifying Rounds were held at the nearby Holdfast Bowling Club in Glenelg North.

Mark Casey, Brett Wilkie, Wayne Ruediger and Aron Sherriff won the men's fours Gold.

Section tables

Pool 1

Pool 2

Finals

Results

+ Spain defaulted fixture against New Zealand due to illness and John Muldoon was a replacement

References

Men